Sir William Russell, 1st Baronet, of Charlton Park (29 May 1773 – 26 September 1839) was a Scottish physician.

Life
Born at Edinburgh, he was the sixth son of John Russell of Roseburne, near Edinburgh, a writer to the signet, and uncle to Daniel Eliott. After taking the degree of M.D. at Edinburgh, he went to Calcutta. where he acquired a large medical practice.

In London for the cholera epidemic, he was created a baronet on 18 February 1832 for his medical services, and in April was elected a Fellow of the Royal Society. He died at Charlton Park, Gloucestershire at the age of 66.

Family
Sir William Russell, 2nd Baronet (1822–1892), British Army officer, was his son.

Notes

1773 births
1839 deaths
19th-century Scottish medical doctors
Baronets in the Baronetage of the United Kingdom
Fellows of the Royal Society
Medical doctors from Edinburgh